The 2012 Wake Forest Demon Deacons football team represented Wake Forest University during the 2012 NCAA Division I FBS football season.  The team was coached by Jim Grobe, who was coaching his twelfth season at the school, and played its home games at BB&T Field.  Wake Forest competed in the Atlantic Coast Conference, as they have since the league's inception in 1953, and are in the Atlantic Division.

Previous season
They finished the 2011 season 6–7, 5–3 in ACC play to finish in a tie for second place in the Atlantic Division. They were invited to the Music City Bowl where they were defeated by Mississippi State 23–17.

Before the season

Recruiting
On national signing day, the Demon Deacons received letters of intent from 19 players.

Schedule

Roster

Coaching staff

Game summaries

Liberty
2nd meeting. 1–0 all time. Last meeting 2006, 34–14 Demon Deacons in Winston-Salem.

North Carolina
105th meeting. 34–68–2 all time. Last meeting 2011, 49–24 Tar Heels in Chapel Hill.

Florida State
31st meeting. 6–23–1 all time. Last meeting 2011, 35–30 Demon Deacons in Winston-Salem.

Army
12th meeting. 7–4 all time. Last meeting 2007, 21–10 Demon Deacons in Winston-Salem.

Duke
93rd meeting. 37–53–2 all time. Last meeting 2011, 24–23 Demon Deacons in Durham.

Maryland
61st meeting. 17–42–1 all time. Last meeting 2011, 31–10 Demon Deacons in Winston-Salem.

Virginia
48th meeting. 13–34–0 all time. Last meeting 2008, 28–17 Demon Deacons in Winston-Salem.

Clemson
78th meeting. 17–59–1 all time. Last meeting 2011, 31–28 Tigers in Clemson.

Boston College

20th meeting. 7–10–2 all time. Last meeting 2011, 27–19 Demon Deacons in Chestnut Hill.

NC State
106th meeting. 37–62–6 all time. Last meeting 2011, 34–27 Demon Deacons in Winston-Salem.

Notre Dame
2nd meeting. 0–1 all time. Last meeting 2011, 24–17 Fighting Irish in Winston-Salem.

Vanderbilt
15th meeting. 6–8 all time. Last meeting 2011, 41–7 Commodores in Winston-Salem.

Statistics

Scores by quarter

Offense

Rushing

Passing

Receiving

Scoring

References

Wake Forest
Wake Forest Demon Deacons football seasons
Wake Forest Demon Deacons football